Window Falls is a waterfall in North Central North Carolina, located in Hanging Rock State Park in Stokes County.

Geology
The subject watercourse is Indian Creek, which flows through Hanging Rock State Park.  The falls is situated adjacent to a rock formation that has a small aperture that visitors can peer through, giving the falls its name.

Visiting the Falls
The falls are open to the public and are accessible beginning at a parking area on the side of Hall Road.  Visitors may take a moderate-difficulty 0.6-mile (1 km) trail to the falls.  Visitors will pass the viewing area for Hidden Falls along the way.

Nearby Falls
Unlisted on park maps is a small, unnamed, 15 ft. (4 m.) high waterfall directly above Window Falls.

Hanging Rock State Park hosts 4 other waterfalls:

Tory's Falls
Lower Cascades
Upper Cascades
Hidden Falls

External links
 North Carolina Waterfalls - Window Falls and Hidden Falls

Protected areas of Stokes County, North Carolina
Waterfalls of North Carolina
Waterfalls of Stokes County, North Carolina